Lophosia fasciata is a European species of fly in the family Tachinidae. It is the type species of the genus Lophosia.

References

Phasiinae
Diptera of Europe
Insects described in 1824
Articles containing video clips